The Elisabeth Morrow School is a private, co-educational, day school in the United States in Englewood, New Jersey, educating children from nursery through eighth grade.

As of the 2022-2023 school year, the school had an enrollment of about 400 students and 95.3 classroom teachers (on an FTE basis), for a student–teacher ratio of 4:1.

The Elisabeth Morrow School is a member of the New Jersey Association of Independent Schools. Other memberships include the National Association of Independent Schools, the Independent School Admissions Association of Greater New York, the Council for Advancement and Support of Education, The Association for Supervision and Curriculum Development, Parents League of New York, Early Steps, the Educational Records Bureau, and the Association of Independent School Admission Professionals.

History

The school was founded in 1930 by Elisabeth Morrow, daughter of Elizabeth Cutter Morrow, and Constance Chilton, with an initial enrollment of forty students. Since the mid-1950s, the school has expanded, enlarging its campus on the grounds of the Morrow Family estate.

In 2004-05, a new middle school was added, so that students can complete their education through the eighth grade.

In 2019-20, the school announced the expansion of its innovative Early Childhood Education Program to include children starting at age 2. There are no other academic programs for two-year-old children offered by independent schools within a commutable distance of Englewood, New Jersey.

Campus
The school's  campus encompasses three classroom buildings, two gymnasiums/performing arts center, three playgrounds, playing field, and a running brook. Facilities include three state-of-the-art science labs, technology labs, multiple libraries, two music and two art studios as well as a middle school social space and ceramics studio.

Morrow House, the former Georgian home of the Morrow family, is now used for fifth through eighth graders. The Little School, built in 1939, is home to first through fourth graders, while nursery and kindergarteners are in Chilton House, designed in 1970. Fourth grade was not connected to the Little School until 2005, when the admission rooms were moved.

Notable alumni

 Robert A. Agresta (born 1983), council-president, Englewood Cliffs, NJ; attorney-at-law, venture capitalist
 Hope Davis (born 1964), actress
 Anna Dewdney (1965-2016), author and illustrator of children's books, including Llama Llama Red Pajama.
 Patrick Ewing Jr. (born 1984), professional basketball player
 Danny Forster, producer, television host, and architect
 Karen O, lead singer for the Yeah Yeah Yeahs
 Larry Kudlow (born 1947), Director of the United States National Economic Council.
 Eric Maskin (born 1950), economist; Nobel laureate
 Lara Setrakian, reporter
 Mira Sorvino (born 1967), actress

References

External links 
School website
Data for the Elisabeth Morrow School, National Center for Education Statistics

Schools in Bergen County, New Jersey
Englewood, New Jersey
New Jersey Association of Independent Schools
Private elementary schools in New Jersey
Private middle schools in New Jersey